Alistair Horscroft is an author, speaker, television presenter and entrepreneur who is based in Australia. He is known for his TV series "The Life Guru", which aired between 2003 – 2005 on the Discovery Health Channel in the UK and then distributed to European networks until 2007.

He has also featured in the media as a mind coach on TV shows, including Loose Lips on Live TV and Popstars: The Rivals. Horscroft has also featured in The London Times, The Evening Standard and The Daily Mail and other newspaper and magazine publications. He is the founder and CEO of The Mind Academy, and also created a phobia cure program, in conjunction with Taronga Zoo in Sydney that ran for 7 years.

He also created a back to work program for the long term unemployed for Sydney Council. He created and owns the Australian government accredited vocational qualification 'The Diploma of Modern Psychology'. In 2013 International Coaching News Magazine recognised him as one of the world's top leadership coaches.

Early life and education

From a young age, Horscroft was schooled in western and eastern philosophy at the Renaissance school St James Independent School for Boys. He was taught to meditate at the age of 4, through Transcendental Meditation. He then began to meditate again at the age of 9, when he was initiated with The School of Meditation in London.

Horscroft graduated with an honours degree in Philosophy from North London University and undertook a 4-year apprenticeship in Egyptology. He later went on to become an expert and specialise in Hypnotherapy, coaching and neuro-linguistic programming.

Career

Horscroft started his career in the UK, before moving to Australia. In the UK he was known as the therapist's therapist and worked as a coach and mentor to celebrities, entrepreneurs and CEOs. This presence led him to personally coach some of the world's most influential people.

At an early stage in his career, Horscroft began presenting on numerous TV shows, beginning with a series on the Discovery Health Channel in 2003, titled "The Life Guru". The series ran for 15 episodes in 2003, which led to him feature on numerous TV shows in the UK as a mind and performance coach. These TV shows included The Wright Stuff, GMTV and Popstars: The Rivals. During this period, he also featured regularly in the British press.

Horscroft moved to Australia, where he created the Government Accredited Official Qualification, The Diploma of Modern Psychology. This is taught as a vocational qualification through his training company The Mind Academy. While living in Australia, Horscroft also created the Fearless at Taronga Phobia Program alongside Taronga Zoo. The program ran for 7 years and had a 100% success rate with every patient. He has also released two self-help guide via Kindle publishing, "Beat Anxiety Now" and "The Science of Thin".

Horscroft founded The Mind Academy, which is a college that is located in Noosa on the Sunshine Coast in Australia. The academy is a private college, offering education in Hypnotherapy, Hypnosis, NLP and Coaching. The college has quickly become globally renowned for providing accredited courses, which integrate Modern Psychological approaches to human behaviour change. Each course designed by Horscroft is said to include Hypnotherapy training, Hypnosis, NLP, Coaching and Life Coaching, Thought Field Therapy and Mind Training.

While living in Australia, he again featured in the media as a mind expert. Some of his media appearances included the Sunrise Morning Show, ABC radio and 2UE radio Sydney.

In 2013, Horscroft published his first book titled, "Beat Anxiety Now (I will Show You How)". Later in 2013 International Coaching News Magazine recognised him as one of the world's top leadership coaches. In the same year he was a guest speaker at ICF Australasia.

Books

 Beat Anxiety Now (I will Show You How) (2013)
 The Science of Thin (2014)

References

Year of birth missing (living people)
Living people
English writers
Alumni of the University of North London
Writers from Sydney